Jörg Cezanne (born 8 June 1958) is a German politician. Born in Frankfurt, Hesse, he represents The Left. Jörg Cezanne served as a member of the Bundestag from the state of Hesse from 2017 to 2021.

Life 
In 1978, he passed his Abitur at the Carl-Schurz-School in Frankfurt am Main and trained as a wholesale and foreign trade merchant from 1981 to 1982. From 1991 to 1996 he studied business administration (VWA), sociology, African linguistics and historical ethnology in Frankfurt am Main. From 1990 to 1996 he worked for the Rationalisation Board of Trustees of the German Economy e.V. (RKW) as a consultant for macroeconomic issues. He became member of the bundestag after the 2017 German federal election. He is a member of the Finance Committee and the Committee for Transport and Digital Infrastructure. He is spokesman for his parliamentary group on air transport and shipping.

References

External links 

 Bundestag biography 

1958 births
Living people
Members of the Bundestag for Hesse
Members of the Bundestag 2017–2021
Members of the Bundestag for The Left